Raymond "Raymie" Ryan (born 1971) is an Irish retired hurler who played as a right wing-back for the Tipperary senior team.    

Ryan joined the team during the 1992 championship and was a regular member of the team until his retirement after the 1998 championship. During that time he won one Munster winners' medal and one National Hurling League winners' medal. 

At club level Ryan is a one-time Munster medalist with Cashel King Cormacs GAA. In addition to this he has also won one county club championship winners' medal.

Ryan is the current manager of the Tipperary minor hurling team, having previously managed club sides Drom-Inch GAA, Clough-Ballacolla and Newtownshandrum GAA.

References

1971 births
Living people
Dual players
Cashel King Cormac's hurlers
Cashel King Cormac's Gaelic footballers
Tipperary inter-county hurlers
Tipperary inter-county Gaelic footballers
Munster inter-provincial hurlers
Hurling managers